San Diego High School (SDHS) is an urban public high school located on the southern edge of Balboa Park, in San Diego, California, United States. It is the oldest high school in the San Diego Unified School District, one of the oldest public schools in all of California, and the oldest still on its original site.

History

Russ High (1882–1907)
The school was established in 1882, initially named Russ School after lumberman Joseph Russ, who donated the lumber to build the school. The school was built in the Italian Villa style with a low-hip roof, ironwork parapet, and open-bell tower. It consisted of two stories and eight rooms. It initially served elementary students. In 1888 a high school was added, with three teachers. The high school students took over the upper floor; elementary and primary students occupied the lower floor. The first commencement was held in 1889, with four students graduating. In 1893 high school students took over the entire school, which was renamed Russ High School.

In 1906 the school building was moved several hundred feet to allow for construction of a new school. The original building was stripped of its ornamentation and was used for storage, dressing rooms, and a cafeteria. It burned down in 1911.

The Grey Castle (1907–1973)
By 1902 the school had become overcrowded and a new school, San Diego High School, was built on the original site, opening on April 13, 1907. The new building, designed by F.S. Allen, contained 65 rooms and was built in the Gothic Revival style, with towers flanking the entrances. It was built of brick with a veneer of granite. Students thought it resembled a castle and nicknamed it "The Grey Castle." In 1913 a polytechnic school was added, with three additional Gothic style buildings housing classes in manual arts, domestic arts, and fine arts. By 1913 there were 55 teachers and 1518 students. The school reached its peak attendance, 3327 students, in 1928.

Balboa Stadium, just east of the high school, was dedicated in 1915. The 2,500-seat Russ Auditorium, just south of the school, was dedicated on May 13, 1926.

Modern San Diego High (1973–2004) 
To comply with California legislation in the 1960s that required all school districts to demolish or retrofit any school building built prior to 1933 for earthquake safety reasons, the "Grey Castle" building was torn down. The first of four buildings constructed prior to 1933 was torn down along with the Russ Auditorium in 1973; Building 101, the "original Grey Castle", was the last building to be torn down in 1975. The current school, consisting of four concrete-block buildings with blue trim, was re-dedicated on November 6, 1976. Gargoyles from the façade of Russ Auditorium can be seen in a fountain near the school entrance, and heavy carved doors from the "Gray Castle" were installed on the administration building.

"Six Campuses" Period (2004–2021) 
In June 2004, as part of the national "School-within-a-School" movement and with funding from the Bill and Melinda Gates Foundation, San Diego High School was divided into six thematic schools, collectively called The San Diego High Educational Complex. Each of the six schools of approximately 500 students had its own administration and staff: The schools were:
 School of International Studies (incorporating an existing International Baccalaureate program)
 Lead, Explore, Achieve, Discover and Serve High School (LEADS)
 School of Business
 School of Science and Technology (SciTech)
 School of Media, Visual and Performing Arts (MVPA; School of the Arts)
 School of Communication Investigations in a Multicultural Atmosphere (CIMA)
In approximately 2009, the School of Communication shut down due to an insufficient number of students. In 2013 the School of Business and the School of LEADS combined to form the School of Business and Leadership, leaving four academies. At the end of the 2014–2015 academic year the arts academy was also closed down. For the 2015–2016 school year the campus was reunited under a single principal, with the three remaining academies – International Studies, Business, and Science and Technology – each functioning under a vice principal. In 2021, the three remaining schools were merged back into a single school, while still offering its International Baccalaureate and California Partnership Academy programs.

Modernization Period (2021–Present) 
In late 2021, San Diego Unified School district unveiled its plans to modernize the SDHS campus. Among other improvements this included demolishing and replacing the 100 building constructed in 1976, and improved HVAC systems for the 400, 500, and 600 buildings. The ground-breaking ceremony occurred on May 2nd, 2022 and construction is expected to be completed by 2025.

Academics
In May 2006, Newsweek magazine ranked 1,200 public high schools in the U.S. and named San Diego High School of International Studies as 22nd best, making it the highest ranking school in San Diego County and the second highest in the state of California. In 2009, US News ranked over 21,000 high schools in the United States and named San Diego High School of International Studies as 44th best, with an International Baccalaureate (IB) exam pass rate of 98% and an API score of over 800.

California Partnership Academies
San Diego High is home to three academies established within the scope of the California Department of Education California Partnership Academies (CPA) program. The CPA model is a three-year program (grades ten-twelve) structured as a school-within-a-school. The first one, the Academy of Finance, was established in 2007 at the School of Business and Leadership. Two more, the San Diego Medical Technology Academy (MedTech) established in 2011 and the Green Engineering Academy (GeoTech) established  2012 at the School of Science and Technology, with the first classes graduating in 2014 and 2015 respectively. The curriculum at Medtech Academy is based on the Biomedical Sciences program by Project Lead The Way (PLTW).

Balboa Stadium

San Diego High's football stadium, Balboa Stadium, was built in 1914 for the 1915 Panama-California Exposition with a capacity of 19,000 at that time. U.S. Presidents Woodrow Wilson and Franklin Delano Roosevelt gave speeches there. From 1961 to 1966 it was the home of the San Diego Chargers after being expanded to 34,000 capacity. Over the years it has played host to music legends such as Jimi Hendrix, and The Beatles in 1965.  The 1914 stadium was torn down in the 1970s and a new one dedicated in 1978 with a seating capacity of about 3,000. In 2009 the stadium saw new turf decorated with the school's mascot, the Caver. The stadium is used for various sports including football, soccer, and track, as well as San Diego High School graduation ceremonies.

Section, state, and national titles
High School Football National Championship: 1916, 1955
High school baseball national champions: 1921
CIF football state champions: 2018
CIF San Diego Section champions, boys' basketball: 1965, 1967, 1975 (D2A), 2008 (D1), 2017, 2018 (D4)
CIF San Diego Section champions, girls' basketball: 2020

Miscellaneous history
San Diego High School's mascot is the Cavers — originally the Cavemen.
The 1922 San Diego High baseball team was barred from league play by the CIF after its 1921 National Championship Squad played an unsanctioned game against the East's best baseball team of that time, Cleveland High.  This game drew 11,000 fans and saw San Diego High defeat Cleveland 10–0.  During the 1922 season the team played college and independent teams, losing to just Stanford and the Sherman Indians.  They beat Cleveland again in front of 13,000 fans.
San Diego High participated in the first high school football game in San Diego County in 1898, defeating Escondido High School 6–0.  Players and coaches from San Diego traveled in covered wagons over the course of two days to reach their destination.
Mia Labovitz In 1987 became the first female in the nation to score multiple points during a Varsity football game.  In 1988, she kicked the game winner (3–0) against St. Augustine High School (San Diego), becoming the first female to score all of her team's points in a contest. She would finish her career with 4 FG and 8 PATs.
It is said that when the wrecking ball came to demolish the "Grey Castle" in order to build a new earthquake-safe school, it took repeated attempts to bring the structure down. In the summer of 1973, contractors attempted to bring down the Russ Auditorium using explosives; portions of the building would not come down. It took an extra six months to finish the demolition of the auditorium.
Kate Sessions, considered the "mother of Balboa Park," taught at San Diego High in 1884.
San Diego High claims that, in 1922,  its cheerleading squad was the first high school or college to use female cheerleaders.

Notable alumni and faculty

 Hobbs Adams, college football all-American, coach (Class of 1920)
 Joseph Cameron Alston, 12-time NCAA badminton champion (Class of 1944)
 Stan Barnes, College Football Hall of Fame member, US federal judge (Class of 1918)
 Belle Benchley, zoologist, author
 Victor Bianchini, U.S. federal judge; California state superior court judge; Colonel, U.S. Marine Corps (Class of 1956)
 Clara Breed, librarian and humanitarian
 Earle Brucker, Jr., former Major League Baseball player
 Eileen Rose Busby, author
 Charlie Cannon, singer, theater performer and co-founder of Starlight Opera
 Darren Comeaux, former National Football League player
 Frank Comstock, composer
 Tom Dahms, former National Football League player and coach
 Bob Cluck, Major League pitching coach, founder of The San Diego School of Baseball, author of ten books on baseball
 Marc Davis, Olympic runner
 Faye Emerson, actress
 Diamanda Galás, Avant Garde Musician 
 Dave Grayson, former National Football League player. Transferred to Lincoln High School after his sophomore season
 Earl Ben Gilliam, United States federal judge
 Neale Henderson, Negro Baseball League Player
 Juan Felipe Herrera, poet, performer, writer, cartoonist, teacher, and activist. 51st United States Poet Laureate
 Tom Hom, politician, civic leader, businessman
 Charde Houston, Women's National Basketball League player
 Deron Johnson, former Major League Baseball player
 Jacque Jones, Major League Baseball player
 Napoleon A. Jones Jr., United States district judge
 Meb Keflezighi, Olympic silver medalist, winner of the 2009 New York and 2014 Boston marathons
 Mia Labowitz, First female to score multiple points in a varsity high school football contest.
 Jeanne Lenhart, senior Olympian, amateur volleyball player, senior pageant winner
 Joe Leonard, Automoble and Motorcycle Champion
 Art Linkletter, television host
 Harold Lloyd, actor
 Anita Loos, Screenwriter, playwright, and author
 Dale Maple, World War II soldier convicted of helping two German prisoners of war escape
 Wayne McAllister, architect
 Bill Miller, Olympic gold medalist, former world record holder in the pole vault
 James R. Mills, California assemblyman and senator, mass transit advocate, historian
 Harold Muller, "Brick," Olympic silver medalist and College Football Hall of Fame member
 Stephen Neal, National Football League player, 1998/1999 NCAA wrestling champion, 2000 wrestling world champion
 Graig Nettles, former Major League Baseball player
 Brent Strom, former Major League Baseball player and coach
 Craig Noel, theatrical producer
 Pablo O'Higgins, American-Mexican artist, muralist and illustrator
 Gregory Peck, class of 1934, actor and Academy-Award winner
 Clarence Pinkston, Olympic gold medalist
 Art Powell, former National Football League player
 Charlie Powell, former National Football League player, boxer
 Clarence Nibs Price, college football head coach
 Sol Price, entrepreneur
 Lilian Jeannette Rice, architect
 Floyd Robinson, former Major League Baseball player
 Julia Robinson, mathematician
 Seraphim (Eugene) Rose, priest, author (Class of 1952)
 Paul Runge, Major League Baseball umpire
 Russ Saunders, College Football all-American, Warner Brothers executive (Class of 1924)
 Thomas Schelling, Nobel Prize–winning economist
 Amby Schindler, College Football all-American, Rose Bowl and College All-Star MVP
 Kate Sessions, horticulturalist, botanist
 Paul Smith, pianist (Class of 1940)
 Steffan Tubbs, journalist, radio host, reporter for ABC  (Class of 1987)
 Cotton Warburton, film editor, actor and College Football Hall of Fame member
 Willie West, former National Football League player 
 Dan Walker (politician) 36th Gov. of Illinois
 Art Williams, former National Basketball Association player

References

External links

Official San Diego High School webpage
San Diego Union-Tribune article on San Diego High School's ranking in Newsweek
San Diego Unified School District school directory entry
San Diego Hall of Champions inductees

Educational institutions established in 1882
Small schools movement
High schools in San Diego
Balboa Park (San Diego)
International Baccalaureate schools in California
Public high schools in California
 
1882 establishments in California